Brian Hannant (born 13 February 1940) is an Australian filmmaker who worked for many years at Film Australia.

Select Credits
Three to Go (1970) - director
Flashpoint (1972) - writer, director
Mad Max 2 (1981) - co-writer, second unit director
The Time Guardian (1987) - writer, director

References

External links

Australian film directors
1940 births
Living people
Place of birth missing (living people)